Damien Wilson (born May 28, 1993) is an American football linebacker who is a free agent. He played college football at Minnesota, and was selected by the Dallas Cowboys in the fourth round of the 2015 NFL Draft. He has also played for the Kansas City Chiefs and the Jacksonville Jaguars.

Early years
Wilson attended Amite County High School in Liberty, Mississippi, where he was a teammate of Gabe Jackson. He accepted a scholarship from Alcorn State University, but transferred to Jones County Junior College after his freshman season.

College career
As a sophomore safety, Wilson was named the Region 23 Defensive MVP, after ranking fourth in the nation with 122 tackles (6 for loss), 2 sacks and 2 passes defensed. As a sophomore, he registered 119 tackles (10.5 for loss). At the end of the year, he transferred to the University of Minnesota.

As a junior, he was converted to linebacker, finishing with 12 starts, 78 tackles (second on the team), one sack and 5.5 tackles-for-loss. In his last year he registered 12 starts, 119 tackles (led team), 4 sacks (tied for team lead), 10.5 tackles-for-loss (led the team), one interception, 3 passes defensed, one forced fumble and 2 fumble recoveries.

Professional career

Dallas Cowboys
The Dallas Cowboys selected Wilson in the fourth round with the 127th overall pick in the 2015 NFL Draft. He was the 13th linebacker selected in 2015.

On May 28, 2015, the Dallas Cowboys signed Wilson to a four-year, $2.74 million contract that includes a signing bonus of $466,315.

As Anthony Hitchens did before him, the coaches decided to make Wilson learn all three linebacker positions in training camp. On special teams he tied for the team lead in tackles (9) with Kyle Wilber and Jeff Heath. As a rookie he registered a total of 16 tackles. Against the New Orleans Saints, he saw extensive play and performed well replacing an injured Andrew Gachkar. He played the season mostly on special teams.

In 2016, he suffered a serious offseason injury on his right eye while playing paintball, missing the first two weeks  of training camp after being placed on the non-football injury list. In week 6 of the season, he passed Kyle Wilber on the depth chart and went on to start 5 games at strong-side linebacker. He posted 35 tackles (4 for loss).

In 2017, he began the season as the backup at strongside linebacker, before passing Wilber on the depth chart in the seventh game against the Philadelphia Eagles. He tallied 39 tackles (eleventh on the team), five quarterback hurries, one sack and seven special teams tackles (sixth on the team).

Kansas City Chiefs

On March 14, 2019, Wilson signed a two-year, $5.75 million contract with the Kansas City Chiefs. Wilson won Super Bowl LIV with the Chiefs after they defeated the San Francisco 49ers 31–20.

Jacksonville Jaguars
Wilson signed with the Jacksonville Jaguars on April 2, 2021. He had a career year in 2021, starting all 17 games, finishing second on the team with 106 tackles, along with three sacks, five passes defensed, an interception and a forced fumble.

Carolina Panthers
On March 17, 2022, Wilson signed a two-year, $6.9 million contract with the Carolina Panthers. He played in 17 games with five starts, recording 38 tackles and two sacks.

On March 10, 2023, Wilson was released by the Panthers.

Personal life
On July 4, 2017, Wilson was arrested at Toyota Stadium on two counts of aggravated assault with a deadly weapon during an Independence Day celebration. He was then released on a $10,000 bond for each count.

On April 19, 2022, Wilson was arrested in Frisco, Texas for allegedly threatening to kill his ex-girlfriend. He was released on a $5,000 bond

References

External links
 Kansas City Chiefs bio
 Minnesota Gophers bio

1993 births
Living people
Alcorn State Braves football players
American football linebackers
Carolina Panthers players
Dallas Cowboys players
Jacksonville Jaguars players
Jones County Bobcats football players
Kansas City Chiefs players
Minnesota Golden Gophers football players
People from Gloster, Mississippi
Players of American football from Mississippi